Narlıkuyu Mosaic Museum is a small museum in Narlıkuyu, Turkey that encompasses a Roman bath with a mosaic tile floor. The mosaic depicts the Three Graces.

Location

Narlıkuyu is a town in Silifke ilçe (district) of Mersin Province. It is situated in a small Mediterranean bay which is fed by freshwater.

History
During the Roman Empire, Narlıkuyu was called Porto Calamie. In the 4th century A.D., Poimenios, the Roman governor of  nearby Corycus, (modern Kızkalesi) commissioned a bath and baptism complex in Porto Calamie. The bath survives and, in 1976, a  building was constructed to house the bath. The building is now under the supervision of the Ministry of Culture as a free-of-charge museum.

The mosaic
An inscription at the entrance of the bath reads:

The emperors mentioned were probably Arcadius (378-408) and Honorius (384-423). The holy islands are the Princes' Islands of Marmara.

The bath floor is a mosaic. The mosaic depicts three Graces, Aglaea, Euphrosyne and Thalia, and a couple of partridges and doves. The local name of the mosaic is Üç Güzeller The mosaic refers to the mythological story of the baptism of Aphrodite.

References

Silifke District
Museums in Mersin Province
Museums established in 1976
1976 establishments in Turkey
Mosaics in Turkey